A marksman is a person who is skilled in shooting.

Marksman or The Marksman may also refer to:

Military and police uses
 , several Royal Navy ships
 Marksman class destroyer, a British class of World War I flotilla leaders
 Marksman anti-aircraft system, a British anti-aircraft system
 Mahindra Marksman, an Indian armored personnel carrier

Films
 The Marksman (1953 film), an American Western film
 The Marksman (2005 film), an American action film
 The Marksman (2021 film), an American action thriller film

People
 Herma Marksman (born 1949), Venezuelan historian
 Peter Marksman (c. 1817–1892), Native American Methodist minister
 Samori Marksman (1947–1999), Caribbean Pan-Africanist, Marxist, journalist, historian, political activist and teacher

Other uses
 Coleco Telstar Marksman, a video game console
 Mansfield Marksman a defunct rugby league side
 On Mark Marksman, a 1960s American executive jet using Douglas A-26 Invader airframes
 Marksman, a lager brewed by the Mansfield Brewery

See also
 Der Freischütz (The Marksman), an 1821 German opera
 Prairie Marksman, a former daily Amtrak passenger train
 The Marksmen, American country music group